"Good Enough" is a song by American electropop artist The Ready Set. It was released as the lead single from his fifth studio album, I Will Be Nothing Without Your Love. It was written and produced by Witzigreuter and the song was released on February 5, 2016. In addition to the song, a remix version was released with Haitian DJ Michael Brun.

Background
Witzigreuter stated, "The record as a whole feels like a reinvention of myself, I stripped everything down and produced the whole thing by myself from top to bottom, so it could feel 100% true to what I wanted it to be. It's a fresh start." The music video for Good Enough was directed by Erik Rojas.

Remix version
The remix version of Good Enough was released on May 20, 2016. The song featured Michael Brun who helped produced the track with Witzigreuter. While the original version never hit the charts, the remix version saw the track peak at number 40 on Billboard Dance/Mix Show Airplay.

Track listing
Digital download

Remix version

Charts

References

2016 songs